The People's Party of the Region of Murcia (PP) is the regional section of the People's Party of Spain (PP) in the Region of Murcia. It was formed in 1989 from the re-foundation of the People's Alliance.

Electoral performance

Regional Assembly of Murcia

Cortes Generales

European Parliament

People's Party (Spain)
Political parties in the Region of Murcia